Paresh Dandona is an American physician, currently a SUNY Distinguished Professor at University of Buffalo.

References

Year of birth missing (living people)
Living people
University at Buffalo faculty
Physicians from New York (state)
American physicians of Indian descent